The Hurricane Weather Research and Forecasting (HWRF) model is a specialized version of the weather research and forecasting model and is used to forecast the track and intensity of tropical cyclones. The model was developed by the National Oceanic and Atmospheric Administration (NOAA), the U.S. Naval Research Laboratory, the University of Rhode Island, and Florida State University. It became operational in 2007.

The HWRF computer model is the operational backbone for hurricane track and intensity forecasts by the National Hurricane Center (NHC). The model will use data from satellite observations, buoys, and reconnaissance aircraft, making it able to access more meteorological data than any other hurricane model before it. The model will eventually run at an even higher resolution which will allow smaller scale features to become more discernible.

Mary Glackin, acting director of NOAA's National Weather Service, says that "It is vital that we understand all the factors of hurricane forecasting throughout the life of a storm and HWRF will provide an unprecedented level of detail. Over the next several years, this model promises to improve forecasts for tropical cyclone intensity, wave and storm surge, and hurricane-related inland flooding." She also says that the HWRF "will be one of the most dynamic tools available" for forecasters.

Development of the HWRF model began in 2002. In 2007, the HWRF model became operational. While the HWRF model will eventually replace the GFDL model, the GFDL model will continue to be run in 2007. The GFDL model has continued to be run operationally through 2012.

See also

Tropical cyclone
Tropical cyclone forecasting
Tropical cyclone forecast model
Tropical cyclone rainfall forecasting
Weather forecasting

References

Websites with the HWRF model
 Community Code from DTC
 Model Analyses and Forecasts  from NCEP
 Experimental forecast Tropical Cyclone Genesis Potential Fields from Florida State University
 Cyclone phase evolution: Analyses & Forecasts from Florida State University
 Tropical Cyclone Tracking Page – Model track performance from Kinetic Analysis Corporation and University of Central Florida

Other external links 
 HWRF Project
 HWRF PowerPoint Tutorials from NCEP's EMC

Tropical cyclone meteorology
National Weather Service numerical models

fr:Modèle météorologique Weather Research and Forecasting#Variante HWRF